Anne-Catherine de Ligniville, Madame Helvétius  (23 July 1722 – 12 August 1800), also Anne-Catherine de Ligniville d'Autricourt, nicknamed "Minette", maintained a renowned salon in France in the eighteenth century.

Life

One of the twenty-one children of Jean-Jacques de Ligniville and his wife Charlotte de Saureau, Anne-Catherine de Ligniville, the niece of Madame de Graffigny, married the philosopher Helvétius in 1751. By the time he died twenty years later, the couple had amassed a vast fortune, and with it Madame Helvétius maintained her salon which featured the greatest figures of the Enlightenment for over five decades.

Among the habitués of Madame Helvétius's salon were Julie de Lespinasse and Suzanne Necker, writers Fontenelle, Diderot, Chamfort, Duclos, Saint-Lambert, Marmontel, Roucher, Saurin, André Chénier,  and Volney. Thinkers such as Condorcet, d'Holbach, Turgot, Abbé Sieyès, Abbé Galiani, Destutt de Tracy, Abbé Beccaria, Abbé Morellet, Buffon, Condillac or Abbé Raynal mingled with such scientists as d'Alembert, Lavoisier, Cuvier and Cabanis. The sculptor Houdon, Baron Gérard and other leading figures of the time such as Charles-Joseph Panckoucke and François-Ambroise Didot were also attendees.  Such politicians as Malesherbes, Talleyrand, Madame Roland and her husband Roland de la Platière, Thomas Jefferson, Benjamin Franklin (who is claimed to have proposed marriage to her), Mirabeau, Pierre Daunou, Garat, Nicolas Bergasse and Napoléon Bonaparte could also be found at her salon.

The salon also provided a steady home for a great clowder of Angora cats. The cats were a well-known feature of Madame Helvétius's salon, always bedecked with silk ribbons and doted on by their loving caregiver. Eighteen in all, the cats were kept company by the Madame's dogs, canaries, and many other pets.

Madame Helvétius died at Auteuil.

In popular culture

Madame Helvétius appears in the 2008 television drama series John Adams, in which she is played by Judith Magre.

Madame Helvétius is mentioned briefly in the Robert Lawson children's book Ben and Me (1939) as having many important people at her dinners, and also having cats (distressing to the protagonist, who is a mouse) and a particularly disagreeable dog.

Notes

References
 Peter Allan, Toronto, University of Toronto, 1975 
 Jules Bertaut, Égéries du XVIIIe siècle : madame Suard, madame Delille, madame Helvétius, madame Diderot, mademoiselle Quinault, Paris, Plon 1928
 J. A. Dainard, et al., Correspondance de Mme de Graffigny, Oxford: Voltaire Foundation, 1985--, in progress; vol. 13 due in 2010, edition complete in 15 vols.
 Benjamin Franklin, M. F--n [Franklin] à Madame H--s [Helvétius], Passy, imp. par Benjamin Franklin, 1779
 Antoine Guillois, Le salon de madame Helvétius ; Cabanis et les idéologues, New York, B. Franklin, 1971
 Claude-Adrien Helvétius, Éd. David Smith (director), Peter Allan, Alan Dainard and Jean Orsoni, Toronto, University of Toronto Press, 1981-2004 
 Arsène Houssaye, Histoire du 41e fauteuil de l'Académie Française, Paris, L. Hachette et cie, 1856
 Lucien Picqué, Louis Dubousquet, « L'incident du salon de Madame Helvétius (Cabanis et l'abbé Morellet) », Bulletin de la société française d'histoire de la médecine, T. 13 (1914)
 Jean-Paul de Lagrave, Marie-Thérèse Inguenaud, Madame Helvétius et la société d'Auteuil, Oxford Voltaire Foundation, 1999 
 Jules Auguste Troubat, Essais critiques, Madame Helvétius, Paris, Calmann-Lévy, 1902
Walter Isaacson, Benjamin Franklin. An American Life. NY, Simon & Schuster, 2003  pp. 363 –367  online

French salon-holders
1722 births
1800 deaths
18th-century letter writers